Below a list of Scheduled Caste communities and their population according to the 2001 Census of India in Delhi.

See also

 1901 Census of Delhi District
 Ethnic groups in Delhi

References 

Scheduled Castes
Scheduled Castes
Delhi